Pavle "Paja" Vuisić (10 July 1926 – 1 October 1988) was a Yugoslav actor, known as one of the most recognizable faces of former Yugoslav cinema.

Biography
He was born in Belgrade as Pavle Vujisić to father Mišo, a police force agent and mother Radmila. He was named after his grandfather Pavle, Montenegrin jurist and brigadier. His great-grandfather was Milosav Mišnin Vujisić, famous hero from Donja Morača and commander of the guard of Prince Danilo. He joined the Yugoslav Partisans and fought at the Syrmian Front. He studied law and literature, and worked as a journalist for Radio Belgrade before getting a small role in 1950 film Čudotvorni mač. After that he tried to become a professional actor, but failed to complete his enrollment at the Drama Arts Academy in Belgrade.

His first major role was in 1955 film Šolaja. He was never a star, but he quickly established himself as one of the most dependable and versatile character actors. In his long and prolific career he played many different roles, both dramatic and comical, and earned great respect from almost any director with whom he worked. He is arguably best known for his role in 1972 TV series Kamiondžije (Truck Drivers), where he was paired with comedian Miodrag Petrović Čkalja.

One of the  acting awards in Serbia (for lifetime acting achievement in movies, awarded at film festival in Niš) is named after him.

Orson Welles said in interview for former Yugoslav television RTZ that he considered Pavle Vuisić as the best actor in the world.

His legacy is housed by Adligat.

Selected filmography

 The Magic Sword (1950) - Vitez
 Perfidy (1953) - Mornar
 The Gypsy Girl (1953) - Guta
 Point 905 (1960) - Pajo Šerpa
 La steppa (1962) - Kuzmiciov
 Double Circle (1963) - Krčmar Marko
 Svanuće (1964) - Ilija
 Prometheus of the Island (1964) - Šjor Žane
 To Come and Stay (1965) - Mileta
 Monday or Tuesday (1966) - Markov otac
 The Rats Woke Up (1967) - Krmanoš
 Bomb at 10:10 (1967) - Man with the glasses
 Macedonian Blood Wedding (1967) - Pop Damjan
 Kad čuješ zvona (1969) - Gara
 An Event (1969) - Đed Jura
 Battle of Neretva (1969) - Šofer
 Black Seed (1971) - Maki
 Walter Defends Sarajevo (1972) - Otpravnik vozova
 Traces of a Black Haired Girl (1972) - Paja
 The Master and Margaret (1972) - Azazelo
 Razmeđa (1973) - Pajo
 Death and the Dervish (1974) - Muftija
 Hell River (1974) - (uncredited)
 Doktor Mladen (1975) - Radovan Tadić
 Anno Domini 1573 (1975) - Franjo Tahy
 Beach Guard in Winter (1976) - Buda
 The Dog Who Loved Trains (1977) - Stric
 Ward Six (1978) - Čuvar Nikita
 Moment (1978) - Ljuba Kvrga
 The Tiger (1978) - Sorgin tener
 Across the Blue Sea (1979) - Šjor Frane
 Special Treatment (1980) - Direktorov otac
 Petria's Wreath (1980) - Ljubiša
 Who's Singin' Over There? (1980) - kondukter Krstić
 Majstori, majstori (1980) - Stole
 Do You Remember Dolly Bell? (1981) - Tetak
 The Marathon Family (1982) - Milutin Topalović
 The Smell of Quinces (1982) - Jozo
 Twilight Time (1982) - Paško
 Medeni mjesec (1983) - Drug Laza
 Early Snow in Munich (1984) - Otac
 When Father Was Away on Business (1985) - Dedo Muzamer
 Life Is Beautiful (1985) - Kruščić, gazda kafane

References

External links

 

1926 births
1988 deaths
Serbian male film actors
Male actors from Belgrade
Golden Arena winners
20th-century Serbian male actors
Burials at Belgrade New Cemetery